Augusta Guelph can refer to:
 Princess Augusta of Great Britain (1737–1813), elder sibling of George III
 Princess Augusta Sophia of the United Kingdom (1769–1840), daughter of George III
 Princess Augusta of Cambridge (1922–1916), grand-daughter of George III